Paddock Mansion is a historic home located at Watertown in Jefferson County, New York. Since 1922, it has been the headquarters of the Jefferson County Historical Society. It was built in 1876 and is a -story brick structure on a high basement in the Stick / Eastlake style. It features a 3-story tower on the southeast corner and the eaves, gables, balconies, and front porch are supported by elaborate turned millwork and chamfered brackets and posts.

It was listed on the National Register of Historic Places in 1979.

References

External links

Jefferson County Historical Society

Houses on the National Register of Historic Places in New York (state)
Queen Anne architecture in New York (state)
Houses completed in 1876
Museums in Jefferson County, New York
Historical society museums in New York (state)
Houses in Jefferson County, New York
1876 establishments in New York (state)
National Register of Historic Places in Watertown, New York